Cathi Bond is a Canadian writer, broadcaster, and novelist.

Bond is noted for employing both "old media" radio broadcasting and "new media" podcasting. She is a regular contributor to CBC Radio's Spark, and writes for Rabble.ca. On CBC Radio, she was a frequent film and cultural critic on Definitely Not the Opera, and sometimes appeared as a panelist on Saturday Night at the Movies beginning in 1999. As a podcaster, she co-hosts Reel Women, a bi-weekly movie podcast with Canadian feminist and author Judy Rebick. She also co-hosts The Sniffer, a podcast about technology and trends, with Nora Young, since at least 2006. She was the host of the podcast "Prosecast", a series of interviews with Canadian authors sponsored by HarperCollins Canada. Bond's novel Night Town was published by Iguana Books in 2013. It is a queer coming-of-age story set in 1970s Toronto.

References

External links
 
 Cathi Bond on Spark

21st-century Canadian novelists
21st-century Canadian non-fiction writers
21st-century Canadian women writers
Canadian women novelists
Canadian women non-fiction writers
Canadian technology writers
Canadian women podcasters
Canadian podcasters
Canadian film critics
CBC Radio hosts
Women technology writers
Canadian women radio journalists
Year of birth missing (living people)
Living people
Canadian women radio hosts